Wesam Malik (born 1 January 1989) is an Iraqi footballer who plays as a midfielder for Naft Al-Basra in the Iraq Premier League, as well as the Iraq national team.

International career
On 24 July 2016, Wesam made his first international cap with Iraq against Uzbekistan in a friendly match.

References

External links 
 

1989 births
Living people
Association football midfielders
Iraqi footballers
Iraq international footballers
Naft Al-Basra SC players